The Bristol Type 167 Brabazon was a large British piston-engined propeller-driven airliner designed by the Bristol Aeroplane Company to fly transatlantic routes between the UK and the United States. The type was named Brabazon after the Brabazon Committee and its chairman, Lord Brabazon of Tara, who had developed the specification to which the airliner was designed.

While Bristol had studied the prospects of developing very large aircraft as bomber aircraft prior to and during the Second World War, it was the release of a report compiled by the Brabazon Committee which had led the company to adapting its larger bomber proposal into a prospective large civil airliner to meet the Type I specification for the long-distance transatlantic route. Initially designated as the Type 167, the proposed aircraft was furnished with a huge 25 ft (8 m)-diameter fuselage containing full upper and lower decks on which passengers would be seated in luxurious conditions; it was powered by an arrangement of eight Bristol Centaurus radial engines which drove a total of eight paired contra-rotating propellers set on four forward-facing nacelles.

Bristol decided to submit the Type 167 proposal to meet Air Ministry Specification 2/44; following a brief evaluation period, a contract to build a pair of prototypes was awarded to Bristol. At the time of its construction, the Brabazon was one of the largest aeroplanes ever built, being sized roughly between the much later Airbus A300 and Boeing 767 airliners. Despite its vast size, the Brabazon was designed to carry a total of only 100 passengers, each one being allocated their own spacious area about the size of the entire interior of a small car. On 4 September 1949, the first prototype conducted its maiden flight. In addition to participating in a flight test programme in support of intended production aircraft, the prototype made high-profile public flying displays at the 1950 Farnborough Airshow, Heathrow Airport, and the 1951 Paris Air Show.

However, the Brabazon was unable to attract any firm commitments for the type due to the high cost per seat mile compared to the alternatives. Being unable to attract any orders, the aircraft was a commercial failure. On 17 July 1953, Duncan Sandys, the Minister of Supply, announced that the Brabazon had been cancelled due to a lack of military or civil orders for the type. In the end, only the single prototype was flown; it was broken up in 1953 for scrap, along with the incomplete turboprop-powered Brabazon I Mk.II.

Design and development

Background

During the Second World War, the British government made the decision to dedicate its aircraft industry to the production of combat aircraft and to source the majority of its transport aircraft from manufacturers in the United States. Having foreseen that the effective abandonment of any development in terms of civil aviation would put Britain's aviation industry at a substantial disadvantage once the conflict had come to an end, during 1943 a British government committee began meeting under the leadership of Lord Brabazon of Tara with the aim of investigating and forecasting the post-war civil aviation requirements of Britain and the Commonwealth of Nations.

The committee, which had become known simply as the Brabazon Committee, delivered its report, which was likewise known as the Brabazon Report. This report called for the construction of a total of four of five designs they had studied. Of these designs, the Type I was a very large transatlantic airliner, the Type II was a short-haul airliner, the Type III was a medium-range airliner for the multiple-hop 'Empire' air routes, and the Type IV was an innovative jet-powered 500 mph (800 km/h) airliner. In particular, the Type I and Type IV were regarded as being of very high importance to the industry, particularly the jet-powered Type IV which would give Britain a commanding lead in the field of jet transportation. An outline of the specifications for the various envisioned aircraft, including the gigantic Type I, was issued by the Committee.

As early as 1937, the Bristol Aeroplane Company had already conducted studies into prospective very large bomber designs, one of which received the internal company designation of Type 159 and another design that was undesignated which broadly resembled the eventual configuration of the Brabazon. Additionally, Bristol's design team had already been considering the requirements of a prospective aircraft capable of conducting routine transatlantic flights, which had resulted in projections of the necessary size, weight, and range of such an airliner. Amongst these, it was determined that a minimum payload of 100 passengers should be carried by the type in order to be profitable.

In 1942, the Air Ministry issued a draft operational requirement from the Air Staff, which sought a heavy bomber design that would be capable of carrying a payload of at least 15 tons of bombs. In response, Bristol dusted off their original work and updated it to account for their newer and substantially more powerful Bristol Centaurus engines. The Bristol design team, led by L. G. Frise and Archibald Russell, worked with several key performance parameters; these included a range of 5,000 mi (8,000 km), 225 ft (69 m) wingspan, eight engines buried in the wings driving four pusher propeller installations, and enough fuel for transatlantic range. The Convair B-36 was in many ways the American equivalent of this projected "100 ton bomber". In addition to Bristol, many of the leading British manufacturers had provided several preliminary studies in response to the Air Ministry's operational requirement; however, in expectation of long development times, and the difficulties associated with balancing the aircraft's range, load and defensive armament, the Ministry never proceeded to take up any of the British manufacturer's designs. Instead, it was decided to continue development of the existing Avro Lancaster, which led to the production of the improved Avro Lincoln.

In 1942, the Brabazon Report was published and Bristol chose to respond, submitting a slightly modified version of their bomber to fill the needs for the Type I requirement. Bristol's earlier work had shown the sort of performance that the Brabazon Committee had been looking for, and thus the Committee authorised the firm to proceed with preliminary work towards designing such an aircraft that year, with the proviso that work on wartime aircraft should not be disrupted by the project. Bristol was soon issued with a contract to produce a pair of prototype aircraft.

Bristol 167
In November 1944, following on from further work on the design, a final concept for the Type 167 was published. As it stood in the final concept, the design featured a large 177 ft (54 m) fuselage which was paired with a sizable wing. This wing, which had a 230 ft (70.1 m) wingspan, possessed an enormous internal volume, which was used to house the fuel for the transatlantic flights envisioned for the type. It was powered by eight Bristol Centaurus 18-cylinder radial engines; these were the most powerful British-built piston engines available at the time, each being capable of generating 2,650 hp. These engines which were installed in a unique arrangement of setting each engine in pairs in the wing; instead of using a common crankshaft, the paired engines each had their driveshafts angled towards an enormous central gearbox. They drove a series of eight paired contra-rotating propellers, which were set on four forward-facing nacelles.

The Brabazon Report had assumed that the wealthy people flying in the aircraft would consider a long trip by air to be uncomfortable, and they had accordingly designed the Type I for luxury, demanding 200 ft3 (6 m3) of space for every passenger, this was expanded to 270 ft3 (8 m3) for luxury class. If outfitted with conventionally spaced seating, the dimensions of the Type 167 could have accommodated up to 300 passengers, instead of the 60 seats opted for. Other high-comfort measures were proposed for installation on operational aircraft, such as an onboard cinema, a cocktail bar, and lounge area. According to Author Stephan Wilkinson, the decision to focus on comfort over other qualities such as speed and payload had been a historic preoccupation of Britain operators to specifically tailor their services towards wealthy travellers, and noted this as having been a key pre-war ethos of British airline Imperial Airways. Meanwhile, some figures within the aircraft industry were forecasting heavy demand from the passengers then relying on ocean liners.

To meet these varied requirements, the Type 167 specified a huge 25 ft (8 m)-diameter fuselage, which is about 5 ft (1.5 m) greater than a 747, with full-length upper and lower decks. This enclosed sleeping berths for 80 passengers, a dining room, 37-seat cinema, promenade and bar; or alternatively an arrangement of day seats for 150 people. At one point, the Committee recommended the adoption of a narrower fuselage that was intended to house a total of 50 passengers; the British Overseas Airways Corporation (BOAC) agreed with this recommendation, and also expressed its preference for a design accommodating only 25 passengers. In August 1943, an agreement reached with the airline led to the selection of an interior layout which contained a forward area housing six compartments, each one for six passengers, along with a seventh compartment for just three passengers; a midsection above the wing – the wing was 6 feet deep at that point – which accommodated 38 seats arranged around tables in groups of four along with a pantry and galley; and a rear area populated by 23 seats within an aft-facing cinema, complete with a cocktail bar and lounge. Similar to the Saunders-Roe Princess, the Brabazon concept was a fusion of prewar and postwar thinking, using highly advanced design and engineering to build an aircraft that was no longer required in the postwar world.

The Brabazon was the first aircraft to be outfitted with 100 per cent powered flying controls; it was also the first to feature electric engine controls, and the first equipped with high-pressure hydraulics. The large span and mounting of the engines close inboard, together with structural weight economies, demanded some new measure to prevent bending of wing surfaces in turbulence. Thus, one of the innovative features of the Brabazon was a purpose-developed gust-alleviation system, which used an assortment of servos that were triggered from a gust-sensing probe installed on the exterior of the aircraft's nose; an improved version of this system, along with fully automated trimming, was to have been deployed on board the Brabazon Mark II. Hydraulic power units were also designed to operate the aircraft's giant control surfaces.

A tremendous effort was put into saving weight across the aircraft. The Type 167 used a number of non-standard gauges of skinning in order to tailor every panel to the strength required, thereby saving several tons of metal. Bristol employed revolutionary new machining and construction methods for drilling, milling, folding, and rolling many of the airframe's components. Rivets were sealed in aircraft dope to greatly reduce the number of rivets required for airframe assembly. Significant emphasis had been placed upon simplifying the construction process and incorporating several manufacturing efficiencies. Some of the design and construction work for the aircraft was shared out to other British companies, such as Folland Aircraft.

The act of manufacturing the Brabazon alone was found to be a challenge. During the first two years of the development, the question of how and where to manufacture the aircraft was amongst the biggest issues that had preoccupied the design team and delayed progress on the project. Bristol's existing factory at Bristol Filton Airport proved to be too small to handle what was one of the largest aircraft in the world, let alone producing the type in quantity, while the adjacent 2,000 ft (610 m) runway was also too short to launch it. While considerations were made for developing the firm's Banwell facility, it was eventually decided to expand the main Filton site to suit the Brabazon. Work on the project was slowed as a consequence of meeting Bristol's wartime commitments; amongst the early physical steps was the construction of a full-scale wooden mockup in the old No. 2 Flight Shed so that components and fittings could be applied and tested.

In October 1945, construction of the first prototype's fuselage commenced in an existing hangar while a gigantic hall for performing final assembly of up to eight Brabazons was constructed; at the time of construction, the hall was the largest hangar in the world. the designer of the new assembly hall, T. P. O'Sullivan, was subsequently awarded the Telford Premium for the work. The runway was also lengthened to 8,000 ft (2,440 m), as well as being widened; this extension had necessitated the compulsory relocation of the inhabitants of the village of Charlton to neighbouring Patchway, which was a somewhat controversial measure at the time.

Mark II
During the early 1940s, the only means for providing propulsion to large aircraft was to produce increasingly complex and enlarged radial engines. The emergence of jet propulsion, specifically the turboprop engine, happened to coincide with the Brabazon's development. Accordingly, there was considerable interest in applying such an engine to the airliner as it potentially offered a simpler and more powerful alternative to the original Centaurus powerplant. Other advantages of turboprops included lower vibration levels (which would increase passenger comfort) and superior performance at higher altitudes.

In 1946, it was decided to build the second prototype using eight Bristol Coupled Proteus turboprop engines – paired turboprops driving four-bladed screws through a common gearbox. This would have increased the Brabazon's cruising speed, from 260 to 330 mph (420–530 km/h), and its ceiling, while also reducing the aircraft's empty weight by about 10,000 lb (4,540 kg). This Brabazon Mark II would have been able to cross the Atlantic (London-New York) in a reduced time of 12 hours. However, by 1950, development of the Proteus engine had run into substantial difficulties, being both overweight and underpowered as well as being subject to fatigue issues at one stage.

In addition to the adoption of the Proteus, there were other envisioned changes for the Brabazon Mark II. In particular, a revised wheel arrangement which had been planned would have enabled the type to use the majority of runways on both the North Atlantic and Empire routes. Although the Proteus was slimmer than the Centaurus, the wing thickness was not to be reduced in the Mark II but the leading edge would be extended around the engines.

Testing

In December 1945, Bristol Chief Test Pilot Bill Pegg was selected to be the chief pilot for the Brabazon. In preparation for the impending flight testing, as a means of gaining experience in operating such a vast aircraft, Pegg accepted an invitation issued by Convair to travel to Fort Worth, Texas, to fly their B-36 Peacemaker, a large strategic bomber operated by the United States Air Force.

During December 1948, the Mk.I prototype, registration G-AGPW, was rolled out for engine runs. On 3 September 1949, the prototype, piloted by Pegg and co-piloted by Walter Gibb, along with a crew of eight observers and flight engineers, performed a series of trial taxi runs; these revealed no problems save for the nosewheel steering not working correctly, thus this was temporarily disabled. On 4 September 1949, the prototype performed its maiden flight over the Bristol area, flying for a total of 25 minutes, captained by Pegg. Prior to the takeoff, around 10,000 people had gathered at the airfield's perimeter to witness the feat. During this flight, it ascended to about 3,000 ft (910 m) at 160 mph (257 km/h) and landed at 115 mph (185 km/h), throttling back at 50 ft (15 m). The British press mainly reported favourably of the occasion, one newspaper praising the aircraft as being "the queen of the skies, the largest land-plane ever built".

Four days later, the prototype was presented at Society of British Aircraft Constructors' Airshow at Farnborough; according to author Philip Kaplan, the timing of the first flight had been set as such to enable such a high-profile early appearance to be performed. The Brabazon's appearance at Farnborough would lead to the adoption of a formal and deliberate company policy as much of the aircraft's test programme in the vicinity of various British cities in order to spread public awareness. Accordingly, the Brabazon was demonstrated at the 1950 Farnborough Airshow, at which it performed a takeoff, clean configuration flypast and a landing. In June 1950, the Brabazon made a visit to London's Heathrow Airport, during which it made a number of successful takeoffs and landings; it was also demonstrated at the 1951 Paris Air Show. Gibb, who flew the aircraft as pilot-in-command on multiple flights, summarised his flying experiences with the type: "It was very comfortable. It flew very well. It was big. You didn't whip it around like a Tiger Moth or Spitfire, but as long as you treated it like a double-decker bus or a large aeroplane, you had no trouble at all".

While the Brabazon's flight tests were being performed, BOAC became increasingly uninterested with the prospects for operating the type. On a test flight, BOAC chairman Sir Miles Thomas briefly took the controls and found the aircraft to be underpowered and very slow to respond to the controls. BOAC quickly decided it was not for them. Bristol had been subject to financial hardship, while development of the Proteus engine intended to power the envisioned and improved Brabazon Mark II was proving troublesome. Flight tests of the aircraft itself had revealed some fatigue issues in the inner wingbox area, while the projected operating costs for the Brabazon had been revised upwards as the programme had proceeded. BOAC, being unconvinced of the aircraft's merits, ultimately chose to decline to place any order for the type. Gibb stated of the situation: "the spec wasn't correct for post-war flying. The people who wrote the specs... conceived of an aeroplane with all this comfort, bunks, and a great dining room to eat in. And, of course, come the day, that wasn't what the airlines wanted. They wanted to ram as many passengers as possible into the tube and give 'em lunch on their laps.

At one point, although some interest was shown by British European Airways (BEA) for conducting operational flights using the prototype Brabazon itself, various problems that would typically be expected to be present on a prototype meant the aircraft would never receive an airworthiness certificate.

Cancellation
By 1952, about £3.4 million had been spent on development and there were no signs of purchase by any airline. In March, the British government announced that work on the second prototype had been postponed. The cancellation of the project was announced by the Minister of Supply (Duncan Sandys) on 17 July 1953 in the Commons, saying the programme had given all the useful technical knowledge it could but without any firm interest from either civil or military users, there was no justification for continuing to spend money on the Brabazon. By this point, roughly £6 million had been spent on the programme and a further £2 million would have been required in order to complete the Mark II. In October 1953, after 164 flights totalling 382 hours' flying time, the first prototype was broken up, sold for £10,000 in scrap value, along with the uncompleted Mk.II prototype. All that remains are a few parts at the M Shed museum in Bristol and the National Museum of Flight in Scotland.

Although considered a failure and a white elephant, the record of the Brabazon is not entirely unfavourable. At least half of the large sums spent on the project had been expended upon the construction of infrastructure, including £6 million for new large hangars and an extended runway at Filton. These improvements meant that Bristol was in an excellent position to continue production of other designs; the assembly hall was soon being used for building another transatlantic aircraft, the Britannia. In addition, many of the techniques which had been developed during the Brabazon project were applicable to any aircraft, not just airliners.

Bristol had also been awarded the contract for the Type III aircraft, for which they delivered the Britannia. By making use of the advances made during the development of the Brabazon, Bristol were able to design the Britannia to possess the best payload fraction of any aircraft up to that time, and it held that record for a number of years. Although the Britannia was delayed after problems with the separate Type IV, the jet-powered de Havilland Comet, it went on to be a workhorse for many airlines into the 1970s.

Specifications (Mark I)

See also
 Convair XC-99
 Hughes H-4 Hercules
 Saunders-Roe Princess

References

Notes

Citations

Bibliography

 "Airborne in the “Brab”: Demonstration Flights from London Airport: Good Progress with Mk. I Development". Flight, 3 August 1951, Vol. LX, No. 2219. pp. 148–150.
 
 Buttler, Tony. Secret Projects 1935–1950 Fighters and Bombers. Midland Publishing, 2004. .
 Castle, Matt. "The Plane That Flew Too Soon." damninteresting.com.
 Gilbert, James. The World's Worst Aircraft. Philadelphia, PA: Coronet Books, 1978. .
 Jackson, A.J. British Civil Aircraft since 1919, Volume 1. Putnam & Company Limited. 1973. .
 Kaplan, Philip. "Big Wings: The Largest Aeroplanes Ever Built." Pen and Sword, 2005. .
 Winchester, Jim. "Bristol Brabazon (1949)." The World's Worst Aircraft: From Pioneering Failures to Multimillion Dollar Disasters. London: Amber Books Ltd., 2005. .

External links

 The Bristol Brabazon – Engineering masterpiece or Great White Elephant
 
 
 "Brabazon Bulletin" a 1949 Flight article

Brabazon
1940s British airliners
Eight-engined tractor aircraft
Low-wing aircraft
Aircraft with contra-rotating propellers
Cancelled aircraft projects
Aircraft first flown in 1949